Olympia Football Club Warriors, known as Olympia FC Warriors, is a professional association football club based in Hobart, Australia. The club competes in the Southern Championship. The club also fields teams in all junior and youth divisions. Olympia play their home games at Empire Couriers Park, formally known as Warrior Park, in Warrane, Tasmania.

History
Olympia was formed in 1960 as "The Grecians", and for the most part of their history have been predominantly represented by players of ethnic Greek background. The club headquarters are located at the Hobart Hellenic Club. In 1958 they changed their name to "Olympia" a name which they kept unchanged until 1997, when ethnic affiliations were removed from Australian football. Unwilling to completely depart from their Greek association, the club simply changed 'Olympia' to 'Olympic'. In October 2009 after a revamped new Board, newly elected President George Mamacas started making immediate changes to the ailing club. They reverted to their former ethnically-affiliated name 'Olympia', and added the epithet 'Warriors', as well as adopting a new logo featuring a Spartan warrior's helmet also replacing the 50-year-old shield with a map of the island State of Tasmania to further celebrate the Greek Australian heritage. This decision was made ahead of the club's fiftieth anniversary celebrations, and taken with the full blessing of Football Federation Tasmania.

Olympia have been one of the more successful Tasmanian club, winning the State Championship on seven occasions, although they have struggled to emulate the glory of the 1960s. During the 1960s they won 5 consecutive state championship, 5 Southern titles, 2 Ampol Cup wins, 3 Falkinder Cup wins and 2 Association Cup wins.

Olympia built strong teams throughout the 1980s and 1990s who were highly competitive. The Club has tasted success in Cup competitions in more recent times winning the Statewide Cup in 2013 and Pre-season Cups in 2013, 2014 and 2015. It won the Tasmanian Victory League (State Champions) in 2015.

Seasons

Honours
State Championship: 1964,1965,1966,1967,1968,1987,1996, 2015
State Championship Runners-up: 1963
Southern Premierships: 1963,1965,1966,1967,1968,1987,1988
Southern Premier Runners-up: 1964,1969
Milan Lakoseljac Cup Winners: 1964,1968,1972,1988,1995, 2013, 2017
Milan Lakoseljac Cup Runners-up: 1963,1965,1967, 1975, 2011
Summer Cup Winners: 1975,1998,1999,2005, 2013, 2014, 2015
Summer Cup Runners-up: 1983,1987
Cadbury Charity Cup Runners-up: 1987
Cadbury Trophy Winners: 1986
Cadbury Trophy Runners-up: 1987,1988,1990,1991
DJ Trophy Runners-up: 1977
Falkinder and Association Cup Winners: 1963,1966,1967
Falkinder and Association Cup Runners-up: 1965
Association Cup: 1961,1965,1966,1967
Lloyd Triestino Cup Winners: 1975
Lloyd Triestino Cup Runners-up: 1973,1974
Bohemian Cup Runners-up: 1986

References

External links
Official Website

Association football clubs established in 1960
National Premier Leagues clubs
Soccer clubs in Tasmania
1960 establishments in Australia
Sport in Hobart
Greek-Australian culture
Diaspora sports clubs in Australia